Ukrainian cinema of the Independence era is characterized by the collapse of the film industry in the 1990s and attempts to rebuild it in the 2000s and 2010s since the Declaration of Independence of Ukraine after the independence referendum of 1991. Although the centralized film industry was in decline, independent film studios, distribution companies and a network of cinemas were developing. In the 2010s, the number of short films in Ukraine was growing rapidly due to the development of digital technologies and reduced production costs. Although the film industry was making losses at that time, a number of Ukrainian films were successful at international film festivals.

State policy of Ukraine in the field of cinematography 

On 5 August 1988, the Verkhovna Rada of the Ukrainian SSR liquidated the State Committee for Cinematography, leaving Ukraine without a state body responsible for cinema development. After Ukraine gained its independence, Yuriy Illyenko tried to restore such a structure by creating the State Fund of Ukrainian Cinematography in August 1991, which functioned until May 1993. Derzhkino resumed its activities only in 2005 following the decree of the Cabinet of Ministers of Ukraine of 22 November 2005. Hanna Chmil became the first head of the new Derzhkino.

Regulation of the state policy of Ukraine on cinema was approved on 13 January 1998, when the Verkhovna Rada of Ukraine adopted the Law of Ukraine "On Cinematography". In March 2017, a new Law of Ukraine "On the State support for the cinematography in Ukraine" was adopted, according to which Ukrainian documentaries, educational, animated, children's, auteur and debut films could apply for full state funding of production.

History of the Ukrainian cinematography of the Independence era

Ukrainian cinema of the 1990s 

In the 1990s, due to the collapse of the Soviet Union and the economic crisis, Ukrainian cinema began to decline.

The number of spectators in cinemas decreased from 552 million a year in 1990 to 5 million – in 1999. At the same time, the audience of TV channels was gradually growing. The number of demonstrators decreased from 27 in 1990 to 8 in 1999. The number of feature films shot in Ukraine per year decreased from 45 in 1992 to 4 in 2000. Out of the 136 films produced in Ukraine in the 1990s, 82 were made in Russian.

In the 1990s, efforts to commercialize Ukrainian cinema were made. Film production was often commissioned and sponsored by business entities. This fact affected the content of films and led them to have more of an entertaining character. Crime dramas, adventure and erotic films were gaining popularity.

The most notable directors of the 1990s were Radomyr Vasylevsky, Mykola Zasieiev-Rudenko, Anatoliy Ivanov, Hryhoriy Kokhan, Oleksandr Muratov, Borys Nebiieridze, Alexander Polynnikov, and Dmytro Tomashpolskyi. Kira Muratova produced as many as five films in the 1990s.

In the early 1990s, TV series were actively filmed for Ukrainian television.  (Ukrainian: «Роксолана»), directed by Borys Nebiieridze,  (Ukrainian: «Острів любові», tr.: Ostriv Liubovi), directed by Oleh Biyma were among the most popular ones.

Ukrainian cinema of the 2000s 

At the turn of the 2000s, the film With Fire and Sword (Polish: «Ogniem i mieczem») by Polish director Jerzy Hoffman, in which Ukrainian actor Bohdan Stupka played the role of Hetman Bohdan Khmelnytsky, was a huge success. Bohdan Stupka becomes the main hetman of the Ukrainian screen – he also had roles in the historical series Black Council (Ukrainian: «Чорна рада») by Mykola Zasieiev-Rudenko (2000) and Yurii Illienko's film A Prayer for Hetman Mazepa (Ukrainian: «Молитва за гетьмана Мазепу») (2001).

Historical themes have also become leading in the work of director Oles Yanchuk. During the 1990s and the first half of the 2000s, he made such films as Famine-33 (Ukrainian: «Голод-33») (1991) about the tragic fate of a Ukrainian family during the Holodomor, Assassination. An Autumn Murder in Munich (Ukrainian: «Атентат –Осіннє вбивство у Мюнхені») (1995), The Undefeated (Ukrainian: «Нескорений») (2000) and The Company of Heroes / The Iron Hundred (Ukrainian: «Залізна сотня») (2004). They were an attempt to convey to the viewer a personal belief of the phenomenon and combat of the Ukrainian Insurgent Army from the eyes of a committed director, presenting an ideological narrative according to Soviet methods.

Since 2004, several films have been made about the Orange Revolution. That time was covered in several films, in particular: The Orange Sky (Ukrainian: «Помаранчеве небо») (2006, directed by Oleksandr Kyryenko), Stop Revolution/Prorvemos! (Ukrainian: «Прорвемось!») (2006, directed by Ivan Kravchyshyn), Orangelove (Ukrainian: «Оранжлав») (2006, by Alan Badoev).

Among the films with the largest budgets of the early 2000s is Sappho (Ukrainian: Сафо) ($ 1.95 million).

Ukrainian cinema of the 2010s 
A gradual increase in film production in Ukraine was in the 2010s. Due to the development of technology, cost reduction and the audience demand for domestic film products (especially after the Revolution of Dignity), the number of films significantly increases.  A new generation of filmmakers has come to Ukrainian cinema. The collective projects of Ukrainian directors are appearing: Assholes. Arabesques (Ukrainian: «Мудаки. Арабески»), Ukraine, Goodbye! (Ukrainian: «Україно, goodbye»), Babylon '13 (Ukrainian: «Вавилон’13»).

Ukrainian film festivals, in particular "Molodist", Odessa International Film Festival, Docudays UA, Wiz-Art, "Open Night", and "86" are becoming important participants in the cinematographic process.

Ukrainian film distribution is experiencing increasing success. The most successful films in Ukrainian cinemas are Forbidden empire/Viy (Ukrainian: «Вій») (box office in Ukraine $ 4.9 million), Love in the Big City 3 (Ukrainian: «Кохання у великому місті 3») ($3.1 million), 8 Best Dates (Ukrainian: «8 кращих побачень») ($3.1 million).

An important event for the functioning of Ukrainian cinema was the new Law "On the State Support for Cinematography" adopted in March 2017, according to which Ukrainian documentaries, educational, animated, children's, auteur and debut films could apply for full state funding for production.

Number of Ukrainian releases in film distribution 
The statistics of Ukrainian full-length movies (feature and animated) releases looks like this  :

 2006 — 4
 2007 — 5
 2008 — 5
 2009 — 2
 2010 — 0
 2011 — 1
 2012 — 6
 2013 — 12
 2014 — 16
 2015 — 24
 2016 — 30
 2017 — 34
 2018 — 35
 2019 – 33

Success of Ukrainian cinema at international film festivals 

In 2001 Taras Tomenko won the Panorama section award of the Berlin Film Festival.

In 2003 in the Main Competition of the same Berlinale (Berlin film festival), the short film Tram No.9 (Ukrainian: «Йшов трамвай 9») by Ukrainian animator Stepan Koval was awarded with Silver Bear.

In 2005 the film Wayfarers (Ukrainian: «Подорожні») by the young Ukrainian director Ihor Strembitsky received the Palme d’Or of the Cannes Film Festival.

In 2008 Ihor Podolchak made his debut at the Rotterdam International Film Festival with the film Las Meninas. Later, the film participated in 27 international film festivals, 10 competition programs and the official selections. In 2013 his second full-length movie Delirium was released. Both of Podolchak's films are considered to be vivid examples of arthouse in Ukrainian cinema by critics.

In 2011 Maryna Vroda received the Palme d’Or at the Cannes Film Festival for the short film Cross-Country Run (Ukrainian: «Кросс»).

In 2009 Myroslav Slaboshpytskyi's second short film, Diagnosis (Ukrainian: «Діагноз»), was shortlisted for the Berlin Film Festival. In February 2010, Slaboshpytskyi's new short work Deafness (Ukrainian: «Глухота») enters the competition program of the Berlinale (Berlin Film Festival).

In 2012, Myroslav Slaboshpytskyi's 23-minute film Nuclear Waste (Ukrainian: «Ядерні відходи»), shot as part of the Ukraine, Goodbye! project (Ukrainian: «Україно, goodbye!»), won the Silver Leopard in the Leopard of the Future competition program at the Locarno International Film Festival.

In 2014 Myroslav Slaboshpytskyi's feature film The Tribe (Ukrainian: «Плем'я») took part in the Cannes Film Festival Critics' Week competition and received three awards at once – the Gan Foundation Prize, the Discovery Prize and the Grand Prix.

In 2017 in the Generation 14plus parallel section of the Berlinale the film School No. 3 (Ukrainian: «Школа №3») directed by Georg Geno and Lisa Smith won the Grand Prix. And Slovak director Peter Bebiak received the Award for Best Director for the Ukrainian-Slovak film Border (Ukrainian: «Межа») at the Karlovy Vary Film Festival.

In 2018 Serhiy Loznytsia's Donbas (Ukrainian: «Донбасс») won the Prize for the best directorial work in the Cannes Film Festival's special program.

In 2019, Antonio Lukich's film My Thoughts are Silent (Ukrainian: «Мої думки тихі») won the Special Jury Prize at the 54th Karlovy Vary International Film Festival.

In 2020 the full-length documentary The Earth Is Blue as an Orange (Ukrainian: «Земля блакитна, ніби апельсин») directed by Iryna Tsilyk received the award for best director at the Sundance Film Festival.

Filmography of Ukrainian cinema of the Independence era

Filmography of Ukrainian full-length feature films of the 1990s–2010s

See also 

 Cinema of Ukraine
 All-Ukrainian Photo Cinema Administration

Sources 

 Госейко Любомир, «Історія українського кінематографа. 1896—1995», К.: KINO-КОЛО, 2005. .
 «Нариси історії кіномистецтва України», Редкол.: В.Сидоренко та ін., Інститут проблем сучасного мистецтва Академія мистецтв України, Інтертехнологія, 2006.
 Брюховецька Лариса, «Приховані фільми. Українське кіно 1990–х», К.: АртЕк, 2003. .
 Фільми України 1992–1996. Каталог. / К., 1996—112 с.
 Фільми України 1997–2000. Каталог / К. — 2000—214 с.
 Фільми України. 2001–2004. Каталог / К. — 2005—282 с.
 Фільми України. 2005–2008. Каталог / К. — 2009—284 с.
 Фільми України. 2009–2012. Каталог / К. — Національна спілка кінематографістів України, 2013—100 с.
 Ukrainian films 2008–09. Щорічний каталог кінопродукції / Ukrainian Cinema Foundation
 Ukrainian Film Guide. 2011–2012. Berlinale, 2012. Каталог
 Українські фільми 2012–2013. Каталог / Ukrainian State Film Agency
 Ukrainian Documentary Films 2013–2015. Каталог
 Українські фільми 2015/2016
 International Film Guide. 2009. 45th Edition. London & New York: Wallflower Press 2009, 
 International Film Guide. 2010. 46th Edition. London & New York: Wallflower Press, 2010, 
 . The Cinema of Sensations. Newcastle upon Tyne: Cambridge Scholars Press, 2015,

References

History of Ukrainian cinema
1990s in Ukraine
2000s in Ukraine
2010s in Ukraine
2020s in Ukraine